Nataliya Katser - Buchkovska is economist, expert on energy and investment, environmental activist.

Ukrainian politician, Member of Parliament of Ukraine, 2014–2019. She has 17 years of professional experience in the field of corporate governance, law, and energy, as well as 5 years as Chairman of the Subcommittee on Sustainable Development, Strategy, and Investment of the Committee on Fuel and Energy, Nuclear Policy and Nuclear Safety of the Parliament.

In 2021 she founded the Sustainable Investment Fund - a green investment promotion vehicle with the aim to accelerate impact investments and bridge the gap between Ukrainian sustainable projects and leading international green financial institutions.
 
Co-author of systemic economic and energy laws (on natural gas and electricity markets, on the regulator of energy services markets, on unbundling of “Naftogaz”, on protection of economic competition and ensuring transparency of the AMCU). Member of the National Commission for Attracting Investments in Gas Production (nine PSA competitions for the development of strategic fields in Ukraine). Participant in international negotiations and parliamentary delegations.

She has UCL Master and Harvard Kennedy School executive education; member of the Aspen community and the Atlantic Council Millennium Fellows. Regular participant of national and international energy and security conferences. Nataliya has published analytical articles in the Financial Times, Atlantic Council, and KyivPost; she is quoted by the BBC, Bloomberg.

Education

Harvard Kennedy School, 2018-2020

Holds an Executive Certificate in Public Policy. Has covered the courses: Senior Executives in National and International Security, Leading Economic Growth, and Emerging Leaders.

University College London, 2010-2011
Holds a master's degree in Law and Economics. Has studied international finance, bank regulations, the economy of regulated markets, corporate law and finance, private equity funds, and investment.

Ivan Franko Lviv National University, 2000-2005
Holds Bachelor's and master's degrees in law.

Millenium Fellowship, 2019
Selected among young world leaders as an Atlantic Council Millennium Fellow (program on change management, responsible leadership, and international policy).

Nataliya is fluent in English.

Early career

Parliamentary activity

In autumn 2014, at the special election to the Verkhovna Rada of Ukraine, Mrs. Katser-Buchkovska was elected a Member of Parliament for the 8th convocation as a representative of the People's Front party (#54 in the electoral register). Nataliya's primary goal was to apply her professional knowledge and experience to catalyze energy reforms in Ukraine, protect Ukraine's national interests as well as to help her country attract international investments.

In December 2014, Nataiya became the Head of the Subcommittee on Sustainable Development, Strategy and Investments under the Committee on Fuel and Energy Complex, Nuclear Policy and Nuclear Safety. While working on the committee, MP Katser-Buchkovska has co-authored 49 bills and 19 laws, including the groundbreaking laws "On the Natural Gas Market", "On the National Commission on Energy and Utilities", "On the Electricity Market" and "On the Principles of State Policy in the Field of Energy Security". All these were crucial steps towards securing Ukraine's energy independence.

During her time as an MP, Nataliya has chaired the "Attraction and Protection of Investments", the "Green Energy of Change" and the "Eurooptimists" inter-factional unions. She has also led the inter-parliamentary relations groups with the Kingdom of the Netherlands and the Mexican United States as well as participated in the relations groups with the United Kingdom, Sweden, Lithuania, Japan and Switzerland.

Besides, while serving as a Member of Parliament, Nataliya has continuously supported the community of her hometown, Buchach. She has initiated and organized the fundraising for reconstruction of the local care home and for construction of a kindergarten in the neighbouring village. Nataliya has paid much attention to attracting investments in the Ternopil region as a whole in order to create more jobs as well as to implement energy efficiency and renewable energy projects.

In July 2019, Mrs. Katser-Buchkovska took part in the new 2019 Ukrainian parliamentary election, as #13 of the Ukrainian Strategy political party. However, the party did not manage to win any parliamentary seats.

Nataliya explores the possibilities and effects of increasing the capacity of gas pipelines with EU countries, evaluates the potential competitiveness of LNG supplies, and outlines the potential role of LNG supplies for Ukraine's energy security. Besides, Nataliya analyzes the availability of alternative gas supply options. She is also responsible for the Institute's international affairs.

In 2020, together with Mr. Ostap Semerak, the former Minister of Ecology and Natural Resources of Ukraine, Mrs. Katser-Buchkovska has co-founded the Ukrainian Sustainable Fund — a brand-new platform for impact investments. The UASIF is set to support environmentally-friendly businesses, such as wind farms, green transport, solar photovoltaic, small hydro projects, biomass installations, clean water, and energy storage technologies. The team also invests time and recourses into strategic development of state-of-the-art types of clean energy such as hydrogen, small nuclear, and LNG. The Fund scales up sustainable finance flow to Ukraine, helps to deliver the Paris Agreement and Sustainable Development Goals, as well as reduce  emissions in Ukraine, while also generating long-term, sustainable returns for investors.

Family 

Nataliya is married and has two sons aged 6 and 8.

Publicity 

Nataliya Katser-Buchkovskaya represents Ukraine at the international level as an active participant in the events aimed at strengthening Ukraine's position in the world, protecting national interests and attracting investments.

Nataliya Katser-Buchkovska is a welcomed guest and speaker at multiple national and international conferences and seminars. Some of the events she attends regularly are the World Economic Forum, Bloomberg New Energy Finance, World Future Energy Summit, Yalta European Strategy and International Renewable Energy Forum.

Besides, Mrs. Katser-Buchkovska is a well-known analytical author on energy security, diplomacy, peace-making process and post-conflict settlement. Her op-eds were published by the Financial Times, Atlantic Council, The European Sting and KyivPost. Nataliya has also been quoted by Bloomberg and Forbes.

External links

Articles

 The tipping points of Ukrainian gas production. KyivPost, 2020.
 Why LNG is a regional energy security solution. KyivPost, 2020.
 Urgent issues for Ukraine’s energy security. KyivPost, 2019.
 Unlocking LNG’s Black Sea potential. KyivPost, 2019.
 The doers’ way to victory. KyivPost, 2019.
 Why Ukraine needs special envoy on energy security. KyivPost, 2017.
 Ukraine makes strides towards energy independence. Financial Times, 2017.
 Ukraine makes strides towards energy independence. KyivPost, 2017.
 Ukraine’s Diplomatic War for Peace. Atlantic Council, 2017.
 Why Ukraine is central to Europe’s energy security. World Economic Forum, 2017.
 In its fight against Putin, Ukraine feels abandoned by the West. CNN, 2017.
 Why are Ukraine’s borders not secure? The Financial Times, 2017.
 Ukraine is important, strong and deserves not to be betrayed. Kyiv Post, 2017.
 Time for Ukraine to Assume Rightful Place in Global Energy Market. Atlantic Council, 2016.
 Reform of Ukraine’s gas market: a chance to move forward. The Financial Times, 2016.
 Nord Stream 2: rule of law vs geopolitics. The Financial Times, 2016.
 Ukraine: turning challenges into opportunities. The European Sting, Brussels, 2014.
 Tools of asset development: Renewable Energy Projects The European Sting, Brussels, 2013. 
 New European frontiers for renewable energy development The European Sting, Brussels, 2013.
 Why Is Renewable Energy Such an Attractive Investment The European Sting, Brussels, 2013.
 Isolationism Is No Solution Ukrainian Business Insight, London, 2012.

Video
Nataliya Katser-Buchkovska, People's Deputy of Ukraine, in "Neutral Ground" by Svitlana Orlovska on the TV channel "Pryamiy", 03.01.2018
 Nataliya Katser-Buchkovska, People's Deputy of Ukraine, on the TV channel "Pryamiy", 14.02.2018
 Nataliya Katser-Buchkovska, People's Deputy of Ukraine on the air of the TV channel "RADA", programme  #політикаUA 15.06.2018
Nataliya Katser-Buchkovska, People's Deputy of Ukraine, on the air of TV channel  "RADA", programme #політикаUA, 21.07.2017
Nataliya Katser-Buchkovska, People's Deputy of Ukraine, in the programme of TV channel "RADA" "The revelation", 09.10.2015

Other
UASIF // Ukrainian Sustainable Fund
Nataliya Katser-Buchkovska // Facebook
Nataliya Katser-Buchkovska // Instagram
Nataliya Katser-Buchkovska // Twitter
 The first meeting of WorldWideStudies scholarship holders

References 

1983 births
Living people
Eighth convocation members of the Verkhovna Rada
People from Buchach
University of Lviv alumni
People's Front (Ukraine) politicians
21st-century Ukrainian women politicians
Women members of the Verkhovna Rada